Thierry Zéphir (born 19??) is a French research engineer at the Guimet Museum, and a specialist in Khmer art and the Indianized world.

Career 
Thierry Zéphir is a former student of Albert Le Bonheur (1938–1996), and a graduate of the École du Louvre where he now teaches the arts of India and the Indianized world. Since 1991, he has regularly participated in the training of students at the Faculty of Archaeology of the Royal University of Fine Arts in Phnom Penh. He is also the author of numerous books and scholarly articles.

He curated several exhibitions including "" (Grand Palais, 1997), which for the first time brought together the masterpieces of Khmer sculpture from the Guimet Museum in Paris and the National Museum of Cambodia in Phnom Penh; "" (in collaboration with Pierre Baptiste, Guimet Museum, 2005–2006); and "" (Grand Palais, 2007).

Publications

References 

Date of birth unknown
Living people
French art curators
French art historians
École du Louvre alumni
Academic staff of the École du Louvre
20th-century French non-fiction writers
21st-century French non-fiction writers
Year of birth missing (living people)